Newell's Algorithm is a 3D computer graphics procedure for elimination of polygon cycles in the depth sorting required in hidden surface removal. It was proposed in 1972 by brothers Martin Newell and Dick Newell, and Tom Sancha, while all three were working at CADCentre.

In the depth sorting phase of hidden surface removal, if two polygons have no overlapping extents or extreme minimum and maximum values in the x, y, and z directions, then they can be easily sorted.

In that case Newell's algorithm tests the following:
 Test for Z overlap; implied in the selection of the face  from the sort list
 The extreme coordinate values in X of the two faces do not overlap (minimax test in X)
 The extreme coordinate values in Y of the two faces do not overlap (minimax test in Y)
 All vertices of P lie deeper than the plane of 
 All vertices of Q lie closer to the viewpoint than the plane of 

The tests are given in order of increasing computational difficulty. 
The polygons must be planar. 
If there is an attempt to switch the order of a polygon a second time, there is a visibility cycle, and the polygons must be split. Splitting is accomplished by selecting one polygon and cutting it along the line of intersection with the other polygon. The above tests are again performed, and the algorithm continues until all polygons pass the above tests.

References
.
.

See also
 Painter's algorithm
 Boolean operations on polygons

3D computer graphics
Computer graphics algorithms
History of computing in the United Kingdom
Science and technology in Cambridgeshire